Commenta in Ciceronis Rhetorica is a work written by Gaius Marius Victorinus in the 4th century AD. It is the sole integral commentary on Cicero's De Inventione which survived. A new critical edition has been issued between 2013 and 2015.

References

Bibliography

External links
Rhetores latini minores, Carl Halm (ed.), Lipsiae in aedibus B. G. Teubneri, 1863, pp. 153-304.

4th-century Latin books